Ernst Heinrich "Teddy" Stauffer (2 May 1909 – 27 August 1991) was a Swiss bandleader, musician, actor, nightclub owner, and restaurateur. He was dubbed Germany's "swing-king" of the 1930s. He formed the band known as the Teddies (also known as the Original Teddies or the International Teddies), which continued after he left in 1941.

Life and career
Annual trips to St. Moritz and Arosa, and also a guest appearance in London, were responsible for the international fame of the Teddies band. Until 1939, he appeared with his Original Teddies-Band especially in Berlin and Hamburg. With his jazzy swing music, however, Stauffer increasingly got in trouble with the Reichsmusikkammer.

Further reading
Stauffer, Teddy, Forever is a Hell of a Long Time: An Autobiography (1976)

References

External links
 Teddy Stauffer in Acapulco
 
 
 Teddy Stauufer: The King of Swing's Paradise

1909 births
1991 deaths
People from Murten
Big band bandleaders
Jazz saxophonists
Jazz violinists
Nightclub owners
People from Bern
Swiss expatriates in the United States
Swiss male film actors
Swiss jazz musicians
Swiss male television actors
20th-century Swiss male actors
20th-century violinists
20th-century saxophonists